Bence Máté is a Hungarian wildlife photographer. He pioneered the one-way glass photography technique now popular among hide-based nature photographers around the world. In 2010, his image 'Marvel of Ants' won the prestigious Wildlife Photographer of the Year grand title.

According to the non-profit Bridge Budapest association, Bence is the ninth most well-known Hungarian (living in Hungary), in the world.

Life 

Bence Máté was born in Szeged on 26 February 1985. When Bence was two, the family moved to the edge of the village of Pusztaszer, and built a house by the wetlands. Bence Máté went to the primary school in Pusztaszer, where both his parents were teachers. Later, he attended the Kiss Ferenc Forestry High School.

In 2000, Bence was named Hungary's 'Young Wildlife Photographer of The Year'. He won that title a total of five times between 2000 and 2004.

In 2002, at the age of 17, he became a member of naturArt, the association of Hungarian Wildlife Photographers.

In 2001, the image 'Susliks' was highly commended in the BBC Young Wildlife Photographer of the Year competition and, the following year, in 2002, his image 'Recycling' won him the title of the BBC Young Wildlife Photographer of the Year.

On 1 October 2003, at the age of 18, Bence founded a company and began to make a living from photo competitions, lectures, writing articles, building exhibitions and selling images, while continuing to spend thousands of hours in his hides. In November 2004, he switched from analogue to digital technology. In spring 2005, he experimented with a one-way glass photo technique, which allows him to photograph shy animals more closely without disturbing them. This technique became widespread among photographers shooting from hides.

In 2005, Bence won the BBC Wildlife Photographer of the Year’s Eric Hosking Award (for photographers aged 18–26). He was invited to photograph wildlife of Pripyat National Park in Belarus as part of the National Geographic's Wild Wonders of Europe, which featured 69 European wildlife photographers photographing the rich and varied natural heritage of 48 European countries.

In 2006, Bence launched an enterprise based on wildlife photography tourism. He renovated a farm and turned it into a photographic venue for hide-based photography. In the same year, he was named Hungary's 'Wildlife Photographer of the Year' for the first time. He won this title in 2006, 2008, 2010, 2013, 2015.

Between November 2008 and April 2009, Bence worked in Costa Rica, building hides for wildlife photography purposes, going on to do similar work in Brazil from September 2009 until March 2010, developing his skills in planning, designing hides and experimenting with different materials and construction techniques.

In 2010, his image of leaf-cutter ants, entitled 'Marvel of Ants', won him the Wildlife Photographer of the Year, and Bence became the only photographer in the history of the competition to win the Grand Prize in both the young and adult category. In 2010, Bence was named Honorary Citizen by the village of Pusztaszer in recognition of his contribution to the local community.

He designed bird and big game hides for Zimanga Private Game Reserve in South Africa, which started a business based on African photo hides as an alternative to classical safaris.

Since 2006 Bence has been one of the 'faces' of Panasonic, as his photography demonstrates what can be achieved with starter level equipment.

Significant awards
 Young Wildlife Photographer of the Year (international), 2002
 Wildlife Photographer of the Year (international), 2010
 Young Wildlife Photographer of the Year (Hungary), 2000, 2001, 2002, 2003, 2004
 Wildlife Photographer of the Year (Hungary), 2006, 2008, 2010, 2013, 2015
 Wildlife Photographer of the Year: Eric Hosking Award for the best portfolio, 2005, 2007, 2010, 2011
 Wildlife Photographer of the Year (international): Birds category, Winner, 2014
 Bird Photographer of the Year (England), 2005
 GDT – European Wildlife Photographer of the Year (Germany), 2015, Mammals category, Winner
 Nature’s Best Photography competition (USA), 2010, 2012, 2014, Category 1st prize
 Environmental Photographer of the Year (England), 2010, Category 1st prize
 Memorial Maria Luisa Photo Contest (Spain), 2010, Overall winner
 MontPhoto International photography contest (Spain), 2014, 2015, Overall winner
 Aves International Photo Contest (Belgium), 2014, Overall winner
 Transnatura International Nature Photo Competition (Romania), 2015, Overall winner
 National Wildlife international wildlife photography competition (USA), 2014, Overall winner
 EuroNatur International Photography Competition (Germany), 2014, Overall winner
 Trierenberg Super Circuit international (Switzerland) Best of Show 2011, 2014, 2017
 Worldpress Photographer of The Year 2017 Nature III. Prize

Other awards and recognition
 Pro Natura award, 2016
 Junior Prima award, 2014
 Blikk – Man of the Year, press category, 2013
 One of the 30 successful young Hungarians under 30, 2014 (Forbes magazine)
 The 9th best known contemporary Hungarian, 2014 (Bridge Budapest)
 Top 10 – leading Hungarians in the world, 2015 (Culture category)

Books

 The Invisible Wildlife Photographer – . English and Hungarian.
 The Handbook of Bird Photography – . Co-authors: Markus Varesvuo and Jari Peltomäki; publisher: Rocky Nook. English, German, French and Finnish.

Films
'The Invisible Bird Photographer'. The természetfilm.hu scientific film workshop, owned by Chello Media, was commissioned by Spektrum Television to shoot a 3 x 26-minute series. The slow motion camera shots were prepared by Bence. Director: Attila Molnár; cinematographer: Zsolt Marcell Tóth, Bence Máté; narrator: Péter Rudolf.

Part 1: The miracle water
Part 2: The three tenants
Part 3: Fish dinner

References

External links
 

1985 births
Living people
Hungarian photographers
Nature photographers
People from Szeged